Beatum is an unincorporated community in Chattooga County, in the U.S. state of Georgia.

History
A post office called Beatum was established in 1897, and remained in operation until 1927. In 1900, the community had 60 inhabitants.

References

Unincorporated communities in Chattooga County, Georgia